The Ren & Stimpy Show (also known as Ren & Stimpy) is an American  animated television series created by Canadian animator John Kricfalusi. Originally produced by Spümcø for Nickelodeon, the series aired from August 11, 1991, to December 16, 1995, with a total of five seasons and 52 episodes. The series follows the adventures of Ren Höek, an emotionally unstable and sociopathic chihuahua dog; and Stimpy, a good-natured and dimwitted manx cat.

The Ren & Stimpy Show is the third of Nickelodeon's original animated seriesknown as "Nicktoons"alongside Rugrats and Doug. In contrast with other shows on the network, it has generated controversy for its dark humor, sexual innuendos, adult humor, violence, and shock value. This controversy contributed to the production staff's altercations with Nickelodeon's Standards and Practices department, in addition to Spümcø's failure to deliver episodes on time, all of which led to Kricfalusi's termination from the show in 1992. Games Animation would produce the remaining three seasons of the series. One episode was initially left unaired until it was broadcast on MTV on October 20, 1996.

Nevertheless, The Ren & Stimpy Show received very positive reviews during its original run and has since developed a cult following. It is considered by many to have had a long-lasting influence on television animation.

A revival for adult audiences, Ren & Stimpy "Adult Party Cartoon", was produced by Kricfalusi and Spümcø and aired in 2003 on Spike TV. Only three episodes were aired before the series was cancelled due to both production delays and negative critical reception, with three additional episodes (all incomplete at the time of the cancellation) being released straight to DVD in 2006. On August 5, 2020, Comedy Central announced that they had ordered a second revival of the series to be produced without the involvement of Kricfalusi.

Premise 

The series centers on Ren Höek (voiced by John Kricfalusi in seasons 1–2; Billy West in seasons 3–5), a short-tempered, psychotic, "asthma-hound" Chihuahua Dog, and Stimpson J. "Stimpy" Cat (also voiced by Billy West), a dimwitted and happy-go-lucky cat. The duo fill various roles from episode to episode, including outer-space explorers, Old West horse thieves, and nature-show hosts, and are usually at odds with each other in these situations. While the show was sometimes set in the present day, the show's crew tended to avoid "contemporary" jokes about current events. The show extensively features off-color and absurdist humor, as well as slapstick.

The show features a host of supporting characters. Some appear only in one episode, while others recur and occasionally appear in different roles. They may either be part of the storyline or make cameo appearances with little bearing on the plot. Some, such as Mr. Horse, are exclusively cameo-based, spontaneously appearing as a running gag.

Development and history

Conception 
According to animator William Wray, John Kricfalusi created the characters Ren and Stimpy in 1978 for "personal amusement" while studying at Sheridan College in Ontario, Canada. He was inspired to create Ren by an Elliott Erwitt photograph, printed on a postcard, called "New York City, 1946", showing a sweatered chihuahua at a woman's feet. Stimpy's design was inspired by a Tweety cartoon called A Gruesome Twosome where the cats in the animation had big noses.

When Nickelodeon approached Kricfalusi, he presented three shows, among them a variety show titled Your Gang or Our Gang with a live action host presenting different cartoons, each cartoon parodying a different genre. Ren and Stimpy were pets of one of the children in Your Gang, serving as a parody of the "cat and dog genre". The network's vice president of animation production Vanessa Coffey was dissatisfied with the other projects but liked Ren and Stimpy, singling them out for their own series. Production of the series' pilot episode began in 1989 after Kricfalusi pitched and sold The Ren & Stimpy Show to Nickelodeon. The pilot was produced by Kricfalusi's Los Angeles-based animation company, Spümcø, and screened at film festivals for several months before the show was announced in Nickelodeon's 1991 cartoons line-up.

Spümcø (1991–1993) 
The series premiered on August 11, 1991, alongside Doug and Rugrats. Spümcø continued to produce the show for the next two years while encountering issues with Nickelodeon's Standards and Practices department. The show was known for its lack of early merchandising; according to Wray, the initial lack of merchandise was "the unique and radical thing" about The Ren & Stimpy Show, as no toy company planned ahead for any merchandise for the show, and Nickelodeon did not want to use "over-exploitive" merchandising.

Kricfalusi described his early period with Nickelodeon as being "simple", as he got along with Coffey, the sole executive of the program. When another executive was added, they wanted to alter or discard some of the Ren & Stimpy episodes, but Kricfalusi says the episodes stayed intact since he did a "trade" with Coffey: he would have some "really crazy" episodes in exchange for some "heart-warming" episodes. Kricfalusi also said that the program was the "safest project [he] ever worked on" while explaining the meaning of "safe" as "spend a third of what they spend now per picture, hire proven creative talent, and let them entertain." He estimated Spümcø's run of The Ren & Stimpy Show cost around $6 million to produce.

The relationship between Kricfalusi and Nickelodeon deteriorated to the point where Kricfalusi would communicate with Nickelodeon only through his lawyer. News outlets and several of the series' staff ascribe the tension to episodes not being delivered in a timely manner. Author Andy Mangels, writing for Wizard magazine, commented that "Kricfalusi's lax treatment of deadlines angered not only the networks, but his loyal viewers as well." However, some of the delays were attributed to Nickelodeon's prolonged approval process and withdrawal of approval from scenes and episodes that had been previously approved. Another point of contention was the direction of the series. Kricfalusi cites the episode "Man's Best Friend" as the primary reason for his dismissal; the character George Liquor is depicted in the episode as an abusive father figure, and Nickelodeon did not want the show to be so frightening and dramatic.

Games Animation (1993–1996) 
Nickelodeon terminated Kricfalusi's contract in late September 1992 and offered him the position of consultant for Ren & Stimpy, but he refused to "sell out". The network moved production from Spümcø to its newly founded animation studio, Games Animation, which later became Nickelodeon Animation Studio. Bob Camp replaced Kricfalusi as director, while West, having refused Kricfalusi's request to leave along with him, voiced Ren in addition to Stimpy.

Fans and critics felt this was a turning point in the show, with the new episodes being a considerable step down from the standard of those that preceded them. Ted Drozdowski, resident critic of The Boston Phoenix, stated that "the bloom faded" on Ren & Stimpy. Animation historian Michael Barrier writes that while the creators of the Games episodes used crude jokes that were similar to those used by Kricfalusi, they did not "find the material particularly funny; they were merely doing what was expected".

The series ended its original run on Nickelodeon on December 16, 1995, with "A Scooter for Yaksmas", and had a total of five seasons and 51 episodes, although one episode from the final season, "Sammy and Me/The Last Temptation", remained unaired. Almost a year later, the episode aired on Nickelodeon's sister network, MTV, on October 20, 1996.

Production

Process 
The animation production methods used in The Ren & Stimpy Show were similar to those found in Golden Age cartoons of the early 20th century, where a director supervised the entire process. These methods are in contrast with animation production methods in the 1980s, where there was one director for animation and a different director for voice actors, and the cartoons were created with a "top-down" approach to tie in with toy production.

Animator Vincent Waller compared working on Ren & Stimpy and SpongeBob SquarePants in an interview: "Working on Ren and Stimpy and SpongeBob was very similar. They're both storyboard-driven shows, which means they give us an outline from a premise after the premise has been approved. We take the outline and expand on it, writing the dialogue and gags. That was very familiar."

Animation 
The show's aesthetics draw on Golden Age cartoons, particularly those of animator Bob Clampett from the 1940s in the way the characters' emotions powerfully distort their bodies. The show's style emphasizes unique expressions, intense and specific acting, and strong character poses. One of the show's most notable visual trademarks is the detailed paintings of gruesome close-ups, along with the blotchy ink stains that on occasion replace the standard backgrounds, "reminiscent of holes in reality or the vision of a person in a deep state of dementia". This style was developed from Clampett's Baby Bottleneck, which features several scenes with color-cards for backgrounds. The show incorporated norms from "the old system in TV and radio" where the animation would feature sponsored products to tie in with the cartoon, but in lieu of real advertisements, it featured fake commercial breaks advertising nonexistent products, most notably "Log".

Kricfalusi cited Carbunkle Cartoons, an animation studio headed by Bob Jaques and Kelly Armstrong, for beautifully animating the show's best episodes, improving the acting with subtle nuances and wild animation that could not be done with overseas animation studios. Some of the show's earlier episodes were rough to the point Kricfalusi felt the need to patch up the animation with sound effects and "music bandaids", helping the segments "play better, even though much of the animation and timing weren't working on their own". KJ Dell'Antonia of Common Sense Media describes the show's style as changing "from intentionally rough to much more polished and plushie-toy ready."

Voice acting 
Kricfalusi originally voiced Ren, styled after a demented Peter Lorre from the film The Maltese Falcon. When Nickelodeon terminated Kricfalusi's contract, Billy West, already the voice of Stimpy, took the role using a combination of Burl Ives, Kirk Douglas, and a slight "south of the border accent" for the rest of the Nickelodeon run. West voiced Stimpy for the Spümcø and Games Animation episodes, basing the voice on an "amped-up" Larry Fine. Some notable artists and performers who voiced incidental characters on the show were Frank Zappa, Jack Carter, Stan Freberg, Tommy Davidson, Randy Quaid, Gilbert Gottfried, Rosie O'Donnell, Dom DeLuise, Phil Hartman, Mark Hamill, and Soleil Moon Frye.

Music 
The Ren & Stimpy Show features a wide variety of music, spanning rockabilly, folk, pop, jazz, classical music, jingles, and more. The opening and closing themes are performed by a group of Spümcø employees under the name "Die Screaming Leiderhôsens". Three Ren & Stimpy albums have been released. In 1993 a compilation album, You Eediot!, was released as a soundtrack album. The album's front cover is a parody of The Beatles' 11th studio album Abbey Road.

Stimpy's rousing anthem titled "Happy, Happy, Joy, Joy" was composed by Christopher Reccardi and written by Charlie Brissette and John Kricfalusi. A cover of this song, performed by Wax, is included on the 1995 tribute album Saturday Morning: Cartoons' Greatest Hits, produced by Ralph Sall for MCA Records.

Grunge icon Kurt Cobain wanted to write a song for the show and proposed the idea to Billy West and John Kricfalusi, but was ultimately turned down. This was thought to be around 1992 when Cobain's band Nirvana was just breaking into the mainstream. Ever since fans have heard about the story, they wonder if the song might be one of the home recordings released on Montage of Heck in 2015. When asked on Twitter if he knew what happened to the song West replied, "I don't think the song exists. As far as I know it had yet to be written and remained a proposal."

Controversy and censorship 
The program's staff did not want to create an "educational" series, a stance that bothered Nickelodeon, leading to the series being criticized by parent groups. Some segments of the show were altered to exclude references to religion, politics, alcohol, violence, and tobacco. The episode "Powdered Toast Man" had a cross removed from the Pope's hat and the credit was changed to "the man with the pointy hat". The same episode had a segment featuring the burning of the United States Constitution and Bill of Rights that was removed, while in "Dog Show", the last name of the character George Liquor was removed, being changed to "George American". Many other episodes included someone smoking a cigar, pipe, or a cigarette.

Several episodes had violent, gruesome, or suggestive scenes shortened or removed, including a sequence involving a severed head, a close-up of Ren's face being grated against a man's stubble, and a scene that was shortened where Ren receives multiple punches to the stomach from a baby. In the second season episode "Sven Höek", during the scene where Ren fantasizes Stimpy and his cousin Sven's death after breaking all of his prized possessions, the part where he says: "Then...I'm going to gouge your eyes out...yeah..." was cut. One infamous episode, "Man's Best Friend", was banned by Nickelodeon for its violent content. Neither Nickelodeon nor MTV would air the episode. Years later on Spike TV, the show's reboot, Ren & Stimpy "Adult Party Cartoon", debuted with this banned episode as their unofficial pilot, even receiving a TV-MA rating.

Episodes 

The series ran for five seasons, spanning 52 episodes. The show was produced by Kricfalusi's animation studio Spümcø for the first two seasons. Beginning with season three (1993–94), the show was produced by Nickelodeon's Games Animation. The episode "Man's Best Friend" was produced for season two, but the episode was shelved and debuted with the show's 2003 reboot. Another episode, "Sammy and Me / The Last Temptation", aired on MTV on October 20, 1996, almost a year after the original Nickelodeon run ended.

Reception 
The Ren & Stimpy Show received widespread critical acclaim. Matt Groening, creator of The Simpsons, praised the show for its outrageousness and called it "the only good cartoon on TV" other than The Simpsons. Terry Thoren, former CEO and president of Klasky Csupo, said that Kricfalusi "tapped into an audience that was a lot hipper than anybody thought. He went where no man wanted to go before – the caca, booger humor". Jonathan Valania of The Morning Call called it "high voltage yuks and industrial-strength weirdness", John Lyttle of The Independent described it as "a gooey media meltdown, absolutely grotesque and instantly recognisable" and did not consider it a children's cartoon. 

The first season of the show currently holds a rare 100% approval rating on Rotten Tomatoes based on 12 reviews from critics, though the remaining seasons have not been rated.

The show came to garner high ratings for Nickelodeon, having double the viewership of the other Nickelodeon cartoons for its first season and later averaging three times their viewership. The show for a time was the most popular cable TV show, with several airings being the most-watched scripted cable TV show in 1993 in the United States. The show quickly developed a cult following in college campuses, and was included in the launch of Nickelodeon's Snick, a late-night block for shows that appeal to both children and adults.

Legacy and influence 
The immediate influence of the show was the spawning of two "clones": Hanna-Barbera's 2 Stupid Dogs, in which Spümcø employees including Kricfalusi had some limited involvement after their departure from Ren & Stimpy; and Disney's The Shnookums and Meat Funny Cartoon Show. However, the show had a wider influence on the future of animation. 

Mike Judge credits MTV's willingness to commission Beavis and Butt-Head to the success of Ren & Stimpy on the network. Writer Larry Brody credits Ren & Stimpy for leading a new golden age of animation, as other networks followed Nickelodeon and invested in new cartoons, opening the way for more adult-oriented satirical shows like Beavis and Butt-Head. 

David Feiss, an animation director of the show, went on to create Cartoon Network’s Cow and Chicken. John Kricfalusi, became a teacher of sorts for Fred Seibert, and was the first person Seibert called while looking for new talent for the project, What A Cartoon!. Writer/animator Allan Neuwirth writes that Ren & Stimpy "broke the mold" and started several trends in TV animation, chiefly the revival of credits at the beginning of each episode, the use of grotesque close-ups, and a shift in cartoon color palettes to richer, more harmonious colors. 

A direct influence can be seen in the series SpongeBob SquarePants with the physically extreme drawings that contrast with the characters' usual appearance, the "grotesque close-ups".

The characters became a cultural touchstone in the mid-1990s, and were featured in works such as the films Clueless (1995), The Cable Guy and Jack (1996). Ren & Stimpy placed 31st in TV Guide's list of "Top 50 Greatest Cartoon Characters of All Time" in 2002. The cover story of the October 2001 issue of Wizard, a magazine for comic book fans, listed the 100 Greatest Toons ever as selected by their readers, with Ren & Stimpy ranked at number 12. Other entertainment journals similarly hold Ren & Stimpy as one of the best cartoons of the '90s and cartoons for adults.

Revivals/Reboots

Adult Party Cartoon (2003) 

In 2003, Kricfalusi headed the relaunch of the series as Ren & Stimpy "Adult Party Cartoon". The new version was aired during a late night programming block on Spike TV and was rated TV-MA. The series explores more adult themes, including an explicitly homosexual relationship between the main characters, strong profanity, graphic violence, and female nudity.

Billy West declined to participate in the show, saying that the show "wasn't funny" and that joining it would have damaged his career. Eric Bauza voiced Stimpy, while Kricfalusi reprised the roles of Ren and Mr. Horse. The show began with the "banned" Nickelodeon episode "Man's Best Friend" before debuting new episodes. Fans and critics alike were unsettled by the show from the first episode, which featured the consumption of bodily fluids such as nasal mucus, saliva, and vomit. Like the original series, Kricfalusi showed apparent disregard for meeting production deadlines, with only three of the ordered nine episodes being completed on time. After three episodes, Spike's entire animation block was removed from its programming schedule. Three more episodes, already in production by the time the series was cancelled, were subsequently completed and released directly to DVD in 2006.

Cancelled revival attempt
In February 2016, Deadline.com reported that Ren & Stimpy was scheduled to appear in an upcoming Nicktoons film reboot. Three months later, Variety reported that Nickelodeon was in negotiations with Kricfalusi about a revival of the characters. Bob Camp and William Wray stated in an April 2016 panel discussion that Kricfalusi was developing a Ren & Stimpy short that would screen along with the third SpongeBob SquarePants film. They later said that they were "not invited to that party" and would not be involved with the production. However, Kricfalusi denied on Twitter that he was making such a cartoon. An animatic of a short that was to act as promotion for The SpongeBob Movie: Sponge Out of Water was released as an Easter egg on the Cans Without Labels DVD in May 2019.

Comedy Central reboot 
On August 5, 2020, it was reported that a new Ren & Stimpy reboot had been greenlit by Comedy Central (along with Daria and Beavis and Butt-Head). Though a new creative staff has been employed, Billy West was expected to return along with a few of the original series' writers. Kricfalusi will not be involved with the reboot, nor will he receive any compensation from it. The series was originally set to be produced by Nickelodeon Animation Studio, but as of October 2021, the series' production has been moved to Awesome Inc, while Snipple Animation announced their involvement in September 2022. According to West, development was postponed due to the COVID-19 pandemic in the United States, contrary to earlier rumors that the project had been cancelled. Paramount Global (at the time operating as ViacomCBS), the parent company of Comedy Central and Nickelodeon, has not responded to requests for a comment about the status of the show, though West reiterated that it was still in production. On September 14, 2021, West confirmed that he was reprising his roles as Ren and Stimpy.

People who worked on the original are also returning such as Bob Jaques, Chris Sauve and former Spümcø alumni Robyn Byrd, who previously tried to get the reboot cancelled.

Home media

VHS, LaserDisc & UMD 
Sony Wonder initially distributed collections of episodes of The Ren & Stimpy Show on VHS, which were not grouped by air dates or season. For instance, The Classics Volume 1 VHS was released in 1993 and included three episodes from Season 1 ("Space Madness", "Untamed World" and "Stimpy's Invention"), as well as the short segment "Breakfast Tips" and a "Log" commercial. Other Nickelodeon compilation tapes, including two themed after the SNICK programming block, were also released containing individual Ren and Stimpy cartoons. 

Perhaps because of the show's adult following, it was also granted a LaserDisc set (the only ever LaserDisc release from Sony Wonder, and the only LaserDisc of a Nickelodeon original series), The Ren & Stimpy Show -- The Essential Collection: Classics I & II, was released in 1995. This included all the episodes previously released on VHS from the Classics I and Classics II volumes, as well as the shorts included on said VHS releases. 

Eventually, the rights for Nickelodeon's programming on home video transferred from Sony to Paramount Home Video. Paramount only released one video of The Ren & Stimpy Show, "Have Yourself a Stinky Little Christmas", which was actually a re-release of a Sony video from 1993.

In 2005, Paramount released The First Ten Cartoons on UMD, only for playback on Sony's PSP portable video game system. Presumably due to poor sales of UMD movies and shows, no further episodes were released on the format.

DVD

United States 
Time–Life released several episodes of The Ren & Stimpy Show in a "Best of" set in September 2003. This set is now out of print. On October 12, 2004, Paramount Home Entertainment released the first two complete seasons in a three-disc box set  Although the cover art and press materials said the episodes were "uncut", a handful of episodes were, in fact, edited, due to the use of Spike TV masters where Spike TV would cut some scenes from episodes to make room for longer commercial breaks. One of the episodes from the second season, "Svën Höek", did have footage reinserted from a work-in-progress VHS tape, but with an editing machine timecode visible on-screen; the scene was later restored by fans. Three other episodes ("Powdered Toast Man", "Dog Show", and "Big House Blues") contain extra footage that wasn't originally broadcast on Nickelodeon. The DVD set even includes the banned episode "Man's Best Friend" as a bonus feature. A set for "Seasons Three and a Half-ish", containing all of season three and the first half of season four up to "It's a Dog's Life/Egg Yölkeo", followed on June 28, 2005. Season Five and Some More of Four completed the DVD release of the Nickelodeon series on September 20. Like the previous DVDs, some scenes were removed in these releases.

A two-disc set dubbed The Lost Episodes was released on July 17, 2006, featuring both the aired and unaired episodes from "Ren & Stimpy Adult Party Cartoon", as well as clips from unfinished cartoons.

Paramount released "The Almost Complete Series" 9-disc set that combines the individual season discs into a single package, on February 6, 2018 and was re-released on January 11, 2022.

Europe 
The original series was released entirely as a 9-disc set in Germany on October 4, 2013. After people said that two episodes on the second disc were not completely uncensored, Turbine Classics offered to send everybody with proof of purchase of an uncensored disc. The set comprises a mix of the known US airings and the German TV airings which included some exclusive scenes of various episodes. Since the set is the first to include all scenes ever broadcast worldwide, it is considered the first truly uncensored DVD release of the series.

Other media

Video games 
Seven action games based directly on the television series were released between 1992 and 1995.
 The Ren & Stimpy Show: Space Cadet Adventures was developed by Imagineering, published by THQ and released for the Game Boy in November 1992. The game's premise centers on Stimpy attempting to rescue a stranded Ren, who is simultaneously traversing alien worlds attempting to return to their ship. The game received middling reviews and was praised for its faithful humor and visuals but was criticized for its repetitive and unimaginative gameplay.
 The Ren & Stimpy Show: Veediots! was developed by Gray Matter, published by THQ and released for the SNES and Game Boy in October 1993. The game is composed of four stages based on episodes from the television series. Both versions of the game received middling reviews. The SNES version was praised for its faithful visuals and audio but was criticized for its repetitive stages, standard gameplay and sluggish controls. Nintendo Power commented that the Game Boy version had good graphics but poor controls and challenge.
 The Ren & Stimpy Show: Stimpy's Invention was developed by BlueSky Software, published by Sega and released for the Sega Genesis in November 1993. The game's premise follows Ren and Stimpy as they travel through their neighborhood and collect scattered pieces of Stimpy's latest invention, the Mutate-O-Matic. The game features a two-player mode in which each player controls one of the two titular characters. The reviewers of Electronic Gaming Monthly praised the game's faithful and humorous visuals and audio but derided the two-player mode as "more aggravating than fun" and "twice as hard as a one-player [game]".
 Quest for the Shaven Yak Starring Ren Hoëk & Stimpy was developed by Realtime Associates, published by Sega and released for the Game Gear in November 1993. It was also released for the Master System in Brazil in 1995. The game's premise centers on Ren and Stimpy's mission to return the hooves of the Great Shaven Yak. Scary Larry of GamePro praised the music as "worth the price of admission" and the graphics as "very good by Game Gear standards".
 The Ren & Stimpy Show: Buckeroo$ was developed by Imagineering, published by THQ and released for the NES in December 1993, and for the SNES in April 1995. The game features three levels based on the television episodes "Space Madness", "Out West", and "Robin Höek". Nintendo Powers review noted that the NES version's graphics "capture the artistic flavor of the cartoon series" but criticized the poor controls and unengaging game elements. Conversely, the SNES version was commended for having more gameplay variety than previous Ren & Stimpy titles, but the graphics were described as "[not] very Ren & Stimpyish".
 The Ren & Stimpy Show: Fire Dogs was developed by Argonaut Games, published by THQ, and released for the SNES in March 1994. The game is split into two distinct parts; in the first part, the player controls Stimpy, who must traverse through a firehouse and gather all the equipment for a firetruck in a limited time while avoiding the Fire Chief, while the second part puts the player in control of both Ren and Stimpy, who must catch items that are thrown out of a burning building. Nintendo Power commended the game's graphics, humor, audio, and inclusion of a password feature but criticized the lack of variety, limited time allotted for collecting items, and repetition of the two levels.
 The Ren & Stimpy Show: Time Warp was developed by Sculptured Software, published by THQ, and released for the SNES in October 1994. The game's premise centers on Ren and Stimpy's efforts to navigate through time and stop Muddy Mudskipper from ruining history. The reviewers of Electronic Gaming Monthly praised the game's animations and various attacks but stated that the controls "could be tweaked up a little more". Next Generation reviewed the game, rating it one star out of five, and stated that "When Nickelodeon fired creator John Kricfalusi, the heart and soul were sucked out of the pair. This game puts the final nail in the coffin."

Aside from these dedicated titles, Ren, Stimpy, and other characters from the series make appearances in the Nickelodeon 3D Movie Maker, Nicktoons Racing, Nicktoons MLB, Nickelodeon Kart Racers 2: Grand Prix, and Nickelodeon All-Star Brawl. A Ren & Stimpy game by Acclaim Entertainment was planned for the Atari Lynx but never released.

 Comic books 
Marvel Comics optioned the rights to produce comic books based on Nickelodeon properties in 1992. The initial plan was to have an anthology comic featuring several Nicktoons properties. Marvel produced 44 issues of the ongoing series, along with several specials under the Marvel Absurd imprint. Most of these were written by comic scribe Dan Slott. 

One Ren & Stimpy special #3, Masters of Time and Space, was set up as a "Choose Your Own Adventure" and with a time travel plot, took Slott six months to plot out in his spare time. It was designed so that it was possible to choose a path that would eventually be 20 pages longer than the comic itself. Issue #6 of the series starred Spider-Man battling Powdered Toast Man. 

The editors named the "Letters to the Editor" section "Ask Dr. Stupid", and at least one letter in every column would be a direct question for Dr. Stupid to answer. This comic series lasted from December 1992 – July 1996.Issues'''

 Film adaptation attempts 
Nickelodeon and 20th Century Fox signed a two-year production deal in May 1993 for the development and production of animated and live-action family films, based on new or existing properties. Ren & Stimpy was mentioned as a possible property for development, along with Rugrats and Doug; however, the show's "cynical and gross humor" was a poor fit for a conventional, "warm and fuzzy" family film. The deal expired with no movies produced. Nickelodeon would later start its own film studio after parent company Viacom purchased Paramount Pictures.

At the Wizard World Cleveland convention in March 2017, Camp said that Paramount Pictures rejected a pitch for a Ren & Stimpy feature film because of the "sour taste" left by Adult Party Cartoon'', and they did not want any further connection with the characters.

References

Further reading

External links 

 
 
 Ren Stimpy Online
 Ren and Stimpy at Don Markstein's Toonopedia. Archived from the original on January 9, 2017.
 

 
1991 American television series debuts
1996 American television series endings
1990s American animated television series
1990s American black comedy television series
1990s American children's comedy television series
1990s American sitcoms
1990s American surreal comedy television series
1990s Nickelodeon original programming
American children's animated comedy television series
American animated sitcoms
American television series revived after cancellation
Animated television series about cats
Animated television series about dogs
Animation controversies in television
Censored television series
Comedy Central animated television series
English-language television shows
Films produced by Jim Ballantine
Nicktoons
MTV original programming
Spümcø
Television controversies in the United States
Television shows adapted into comics
Television shows adapted into video games
Television series created by John Kricfalusi
Television series by Rough Draft Studios
Television shows set in Los Angeles